These are the official results of the Men's Team Pursuit at the 1992 Summer Olympics in Barcelona, Spain. The races were held on Thursday, July 30, and Friday, July 31, 1992 at the Velòdrom d'Hortawith a race distance of 4 km.

Medalists

Results
Q Qualified for next round.
ovtk Overtaken by opponent during heat.
DNS Did not start.
WR New world record.

Qualifying round
Held July 30

The twenty-one teams raced against the clock, not against each other.  The teams with the eight  fastest times advanced to the quarter-final.

Quarter-finals
Held July 30
In the first round of actual match competition, teams were seeded into matches based on their times from the qualifying round.  The winners of the four heats advanced to the semi-finals.

Heat 1

Heat 2

Heat 3

Heat 4

Semi-finals
Held July 31
The winner of the two heats advance to the finals, for the gold medal.  The loser with the fastest semi-final time wins the bronze.

Heat 1

Heat 2

Final
Held July 31

Final classification

References

External links
Official Olympic Report

M
Cycling at the Summer Olympics – Men's team pursuit
Track cycling at the 1992 Summer Olympics
Men's events at the 1992 Summer Olympics